Älpelekopf is a mountain with an elevation of 1,606 m (5,269 ft) in the Alps.  Älpelekopf has a secondary peak situated on a ridge which runs southwest from Riffenkopf to Schrofen at which point the ridge falls off steeply.  

The ridges connecting Riffenkopf, Hahnenkopf and Wannenkopf form a ring around the valley Gerstruber Älpeles.  This valley has a deserted cabin  and was formerly used as a pastoral area.  There's a second cabin to the north, called Lugenalpe which is in current use.

There is no marked path up to the summit.  It can be summited via Gerstruber Älpele, but the trail requires technical experience.  Älpelekopf is not a typical tourist destination.

References 
 Thaddäus Steiner: Allgäuer Bergnamen, Lindenberg, Kunstverlag Josef Fink, 2007, 
 Thaddäus Steiner: Die Flurnamen der Gemeinde Oberstdorf im Allgäu, München, Selbstverlag des Verbandes für Flurnamenforschung in Bayern, 1972
 Zettler/Groth: Alpenvereinsführer Allgäuer Alpen. Bergverlag Rudolf Rother, München 1984. 
                      
                        
Mountains of the Alps
Mountains of Bavaria